The 2011–12 The Citadel Bulldogs basketball team represented The Citadel, The Military College of South Carolina in the 2011-12 NCAA Division I men's basketball season.  The Bulldogs were led by second year head coach Chuck Driesell and played their home games at McAlister Field House. They are a member of the South Division of the Southern Conference. They finished the season 6–24, 3–15 in SoCon play to finish in last place in the South Division. They lost in the first round of the SoCon Basketball tournament to Western Carolina.

Preseason
Media covering the Southern Conference picked The Citadel to finish sixth in the South Division, with 48 points total out of a possible 180.  Davidson, College of Charleston, Wofford, Furman, and Georgia Southern were picked to finish ahead of the Bulldogs in the division.

Recruiting

Roster

Coaching staff

Schedule
The 2011–12 Bulldogs opened the regular season in Colorado Springs, CO for the inaugural All-Military Classic, featuring Army, VMI, and host Air Force.  The non-conference schedule featured home tilts with in-state rivals Clemson, Coastal Carolina and Charleston Southern as well as road games at James Madison, Denver, and Tennessee.  The Southern Conference slate began with three straight road games and featured home and home matchups with South Division foes College of Charleston, Wofford, Furman, Davidson, and Georgia Southern.  Cross divisional teams that Bulldogs faced twice were UNC Greensboro and Elon.  North Division opponents Samford and Appalachian State visited McAlister Field House, while the Bulldogs traveled to Western Carolina and Chattanooga.  The regular season slate closed with three straight cross-divisional games before the finale with rival College of Charleston.  No team on the schedule was included in the Preseason Top 25 or the Top 25 during the season.

|-
! colspan=8 style=""|Exhibition

|-
! colspan=8 style=""|Regular Season

|-
! colspan=8 style=""|

References

The Citadel Bulldogs basketball seasons
Citadel
Citadel
Citadel